Helen Irene Battle (August 31, 1903 – June 17, 1994) was a pioneering Canadian ichthyologist and marine biologist. She was the first Canadian woman to earn a PhD in marine biology and she was also one of the first zoologists to engage in laboratory research (as opposed to field research). She was an emeritus professor of zoology at the University of Western Ontario from 1972.

Early life and education 
Born in London, Ontario, she received B.A. (1923) and M.A. (1924) from University of Western Ontario (Western University) and was only 16 years old when she started her undergraduate degree. Her master's thesis was on the field of fish embryology. She completed her PhD at the University of Toronto in 1928 under the supervision of Archibald G. Huntsman, whereby she also became the first woman in Canada to earn a PhD in Marine Biology.

Career 
From 1929 to 1967, Battle served on the faculty of Western University. Battle's teaching career spanned over fifty years and 4,500 students, involving topics such as the embryology of marine life and teaching methodology. During her tenure, Dr. Battle fought for improving the position of women in universities and encouraged women to study science and go to graduate school. In 1956, Battle became Acting Head of the Zoology Department at Western University, in which she was instrumental in the design and creation of the Biology and Geology Building at Western University. Even after her retirement in 1967, Battle found innovative ways to teach and was one of the first instructors to use television, taping a series of lectures for the Natural Science Centre.

Her research included examining the impact of pollutants on marine life and drinking water through the analysis of fertilized fish eggs. She was one of the first zoologists to actively apply laboratory research methods to marine problems, including histology and physiology methods. She also pioneered the use of fish eggs to study the effects of cancer-causing substances on cell development. She published 37 research articles between 1926 and 1973, in which many of her papers are illustrated with her own ink drawings.

She co-founded the Canadian Society of Zoologists (CSZ) in 1961, and served as president for the society from 1962-1963. She was awarded the Canadian Centennial Medal in 1967, and in 1971 was awarded an honorary Doctor of Laws from Western as well as a Doctor of Science from Carleton University. She received the F. E. J. Fry medal from the Canadian Society of Zoologists in 1977, becoming the first woman recipient. She was an honorary member of the National Association of Biology Teachers, and in 1991, the Canadian Society of Zoologists established the Helen I. Battle award in her honour.

She is featured in a series of digital posters showcasing the stories and achievements of women in science, technology, engineering, and mathematics (STEM) that is an ongoing initiative of Ingenium - Canada's Network of Science and Tech Museums.

See also
Timeline of women in science
Helen Irene Battle - Hook, Line, and Thinker

References

1903 births
1994 deaths
Canadian marine biologists
Canadian ichthyologists
Canadian women biologists
Women ichthyologists
People from London, Ontario
University of Western Ontario alumni
Academic staff of the University of Western Ontario
University of Toronto alumni
Women marine biologists
20th-century Canadian women scientists
20th-century Canadian zoologists
Embryologists
Presidents of the Canadian Society of Zoologists